Williella is a genus of moths belonging to the subfamily Tortricinae of the family Tortricidae.

Details 
The moth genus Williella, family Tortricidae, subfamily Tortricinae, was established in 1984 to accommodate two newly-described species from New Caledonia: Williella sauteri and Williella angulata.

Williella was tentatively assigned to the base of the Archipini. Phylogenetic analysis of their plesiomorphic morphology suggested that Williella species are members of a group of isolated and generalized moths from Australia, New Zealand and South America.

The discovery of the genus in New Caledonia suggested that these plesiomorphic modern Tortricinae are isolated descendants of a group of very generalized Tortricinae that were distributed throughout the Gondwana supercontinent before it broke up into many of the main modern landmasses of the Southern Hemisphere.

Species 
Williella angulata Horak, 1984
Williella picdupina Razowski, 2013
Williella sauteri Horak, 1984

See also
List of Tortricidae genera

References

External links
Tortricid.net

Archipini
Tortricidae genera
Taxa named by Marianne Horak